One 4 All (original title: Une pour toutes) is a French romantic comedy film directed by Claude Lelouch, released in 1999.

Synopsis
Three actresses decide to use their talents to seduce rich men. However, their 'perfect plan' succumbs to the hazards of life.

Starring
Jean-Pierre Marielle : Commissaire Bayard
Anne Parillaud : Olga Duclos
Alessandra Martines : Maxime
Marianne Denicourt : Irina Colbert
Alice Evans : Macha Desachy
Olivia Bonamy : Olivia Colbert
Samy Naceri : Sam Morvan
Geneviève Fontanel : Lola
Bruno Lochet : The plumber
 : Minouche
Firmine Richard : The handmaid of the president
Claude Lelouch : Himself
Albert Delpy : The colleague
Jean-Marie Winling : The banker
 : The King of the Night
Pascale Arbillot : The businesswoman
François Berléand : Unpleasant passenger
François Perrot : The producer
Rüdiger Vogler : The conductor
Anouk Aimée : His wife
Maka Kotto : Omar, the dictator
Michel Jonasz : The friendly passenger

References

External links

French romantic comedy films
1999 films
Films directed by Claude Lelouch
1990s French films
2000s French films